Wallace Brett Donham (1877 – November 29, 1954) was an American organizational theorist, professor of business administration and the second dean of the Harvard Business School, from 1919 to 1942. The use of case studies in the HBS education curriculum was greatly expanded during Donham's time as dean.

Donham graduated from Harvard College in 1899 and then from Harvard Law School. Before becoming Dean, Donham was vice-president of the Old Colony Trust Company in Boston, from 1906 until 1919. He set out his business philosophy in two books, Business Adrift (with Alfred North Whitehead) (1931) and Business Looks at the Unforeseen (1932)."

References

Archives and records
Wallace Brett Donham papers at Baker Library Special Collections, Harvard Business School.
Wallace Brett Donham cases and teaching files at Baker Library Special Collections, Harvard Business School.

1877 births
1954 deaths
Harvard Business School faculty
Harvard Law School alumni
Business school deans